Group B of the 2015 CONCACAF Gold Cup was one of three groups competing of nations at the 2015 CONCACAF Gold Cup. The group's matches were played in July. Four group matches were played at venues in the United States and two were played in Canada. Matches were played at Carson's StubHub Center on July 8, Houston's BBVA Compass Stadium on July 11 and Toronto's BMO Field on July 14.

It was the first time Canada had hosted a CONCACAF Gold Cup match.

Teams

Notes

Standings

In the quarter-finals:
Jamaica advanced to play Haiti (runner-up of Group A).
Costa Rica advanced to play Mexico (runner-up of Group C).

Matches
All times EDT (UTC−4). If the venue is located in a different time zone, the local time is given in parentheses.

Costa Rica vs Jamaica

El Salvador vs Canada

Jamaica vs Canada

Costa Rica vs El Salvador

Jamaica vs El Salvador

Canada vs Costa Rica

References

External links
 

Group B